Liberty Plaza may refer to:

Liberty Plaza (Atlanta), a public plaza in Atlanta
Liberty Plaza, Colombo, a shopping mall in Sri Lanka
Liberty Square (Taipei), a public plaza in Taipei
Zuccotti Park in New York City, previously known as Liberty Plaza Park

See also
 Liberty Place, Philadelphia, Pennsylvania